Lesbian Nation: The Feminist Solution is a 1973 book by the radical lesbian feminist author and cultural critic Jill Johnston. The book was originally published as a series of essays featured in The Village Voice from 1969 to 1972.

Thesis
In the book Johnston outlines her vision of radical lesbian feminism. She argues in favor of lesbian separatism, writing that women should make a total break from men and male-dominated capitalist institutions. Johnston also wrote that female heterosexuality was a form of collaboration with patriarchy. Writing in the Gay & Lesbian Review in 2007, Johnston summarized her views:

Reception
Becki L. Ross wrote the book The House That Jill Built: A Lesbian Nation in Formation, which analyzes the history of the lesbian feminist movement.

References

1970s LGBT literature
1973 non-fiction books
Anti-capitalism
Lesbian feminist books
Lesbian separatism
Radical feminist books
Separatist feminism